Kevin Brooks Eastman (born May 30, 1962) is an American comic book artist and writer best known for co-creating the Teenage Mutant Ninja Turtles with Peter Laird. Eastman was also formerly the editor and publisher of the magazine Heavy Metal.

Early life and career
Eastman was born in Portland, ME. He attended Westbrook High School in Westbrook, Maine, with comic book illustrator Steve Lavigne.  He grew up a comic book fan, with Jack Kirby as his idol and Kamandi as his favorite title of his.

In 1983 he worked in a restaurant while he searched for publishers for his comics. He met a waitress who was attending the University of Massachusetts Amherst and followed her to Northampton, Massachusetts. While searching for a local underground newspaper to publish his work, he began a professional relationship with Peter Laird, who worked at nearby Dover, New Hampshire, and the two collaborated for a short time on various comics projects.

In May 1984, Eastman and Laird self-published the first black & white issue of Teenage Mutant Ninja Turtles. The forty-page oversized comic had an initial print run of 3,275 copies and was largely funded by a US$1000 loan from Eastman's uncle Quentin. It was published by the duo's Mirage Studios, a name chosen because, as Eastman says, "there wasn't an actual studio, only kitchen tables and couches with lap boards." By September 1985, their first issue had received three additional printings.

Teenage Mutant Ninja Turtles

Laird's newspaper experience led to the two creating a four-page press kit, which included a story outline and artwork. They sent the press kit to 180 television and radio stations as well as to the Associated Press and United Press International. This led to widespread press coverage of both the Teenage Mutant Ninja Turtles and Mirage Studios itself, creating a demand for the comic. With their second issue, Eastman and Laird's Turtles comic began a quick rise to success, bringing in advance orders of 15,000 copies, five times the initial print run of the first issue. This earned Eastman and Laird a profit of $2,000 each and allowed them to become full-time comic book creators.

The Turtles phenomenon saw the duo invited to their first comics convention at the tenth annual Atlanta Fantasy Fair in 1984, where they mingled with notable comic creators like Larry Niven, Forrest J Ackerman and Fred Hembeck.

Their fifth issue of Teenage Mutant Ninja Turtles was released in November 1985, and was downsized to the more common American comics-format and size. The previous four issues were also reprinted in this size and format with new colored covers. Also in 1985, Solson Publications released How to Draw Eastman and Laird's Teenage Mutant Ninja Turtles. Solson would follow this up with the six-issue Teenage Mutant Ninja Turtles Authorized Martial Arts Training Manual as well as one issue of Teenage Mutant Ninja Turtles Teach Karate volume in 1987.

Licensing
Mirage's Turtles comic led to a widening media presence for the heroes. Eastman and Laird began to widely merchandise their property. Dark Horse Miniatures produced a set of 15 lead figurines for role-playing gamers and collectors, Palladium Books produced a role-playing game featuring the Turtles, and First Comics reprinted in four volumes the first eleven issues as color trade paperback collections.

Palladium's role-playing game brought the Turtles to the attention of licensing agent Mark Freedman and the Turtles phenomenon took off, with the various characters soon appearing on T-shirts, Halloween masks, mugs, and other paraphernalia. A five-part televised cartoon mini-series based on the Turtles debuted in December 1987. The half-hour episodes were produced by Osamu Yoshioka and the animation was directed by Yoshikatsu Kasai from scripts by David Wise and Patti Howeth. The mini-series was successful, leading to a full series, with the mini-series forming the first season. The series had a 9-year, 10-season, 193-episode run. Bob Burden writes:

In January 1988, Eastman and Laird visited Playmates Toys, who wished to market action figures based on the comic book and animated cartoon series, further cementing the Turtles' place in history and making Eastman and Laird extremely successful.

Multimedia
Multiple other Turtles comics, toys, books, games, and other merchandising items have subsequently appeared, overseen and sometimes fully created by Eastman and Laird. Among these are five live-action films: Teenage Mutant Ninja Turtles (1990), Teenage Mutant Ninja Turtles II: The Secret of the Ooze (1991), Teenage Mutant Ninja Turtles III (1993), Teenage Mutant Ninja Turtles (2014), and Teenage Mutant Ninja Turtles: Out of the Shadows (2016), with Eastman making a brief cameo in the latter. Four more television series were also created: Ninja Turtles: The Next Mutation (1997), Teenage Mutant Ninja Turtles (2003), Teenage Mutant Ninja Turtles (2012), and Rise of the Teenage Mutant Ninja Turtles. There was also an animated feature film, TMNT (2007).

Eastman wrote the 2012 Teenage Mutant Ninja Turtles episode "Lone Rat and Cubs". He also co-wrote the 2016 stand-alone TMNT short "Pizza Friday".

Eastman and Laird parting ways
Creative differences began to strain Eastman and Laird's partnership. In an interview in 2002, Laird noted that the two hadn't spent much time together since 1993. Eastman moved to California while Laird stayed in Massachusetts.

On June 1, 2000, Laird and the Mirage Group purchased Eastman's ownership in the Teenage Mutant Ninja Turtles property and corporations. Eastman wanted to move on to other projects. The buyout was completed on March 1, 2008.

In 2011, Eastman began working with the TMNT series again as a writer and artist on the IDW comic series, as well as an adviser on the 2014 reboot of the Teenage Mutant Ninja Turtles film series. Eastman is said to have a cameo in the film as a doctor, and has voiced the character Ice Cream Kitty in the 2012 CGI series.

In December 2019, issue #100 of IDW Publishing's Teenage Mutant Ninja Turtles comic series featured a teaser ad for an upcoming comic project titled The Last Ronin in which the prospect of a possible reunion and cooperation between Eastman and Laird was held out. The project was confirmed in April 2020, with a TBD release date sometime in the summer, and was subsequently released in October 2020.

Tundra

Foundation
While co-managing Mirage Studios, Eastman and Laird often spoke of the difficulties in maintaining creative control of their work. Eastman decided to address this problem by using his own personal knowledge and connections to help other creators. Approaching Laird with his ideas, Eastman was met with a less than positive response:

Intentions and output
Eastman founded Tundra Publishing in 1990, to realize personal and other projects. He joined with other comic creators like Scott McCloud and Dave Sim to form the Creator's Bill of Rights. Eastman felt obligated to expand it beyond theory and into practice, providing a forum for comics creators to work for a publisher while maintaining ownership of their work.

Rick Veitch has written that:

Moreover, Eastman provided a forum for Marvel and DC creators to work on projects that they could not otherwise realize:

Projects (partly) realized by Tundra included: Alan Moore and Bill Sienkiewicz's Big Numbers, Moore and Eddie Campbell's From Hell, Moore and Melinda Gebbie's Lost Girls (these last two original serialised in Stephen R. Bissette's Taboo anthology, which was also part-published by Tundra), The Crow, Mike Allred's Madman and Dave McKean's Cages, and others.

Eastman initially thought that his experience at Mirage gave him "a pretty good grasp of what a publisher should be, and what a publisher needs to do," although he swiftly realized that "Tundra was not like publishing the Turtles."

Difficulties
As part of Eastman's designs for Tundra were to produce personal projects of a more adult nature than the Turtles-oriented Mirage was geared towards, this saw Tundra fitting in the dubious middle-ground, as their intended product sat somewhat awkwardly between the comic shop and the book shop. Eastman says that he "thought that the audience was a lot larger than it actually was," citing his personal assumption that readers would "grow up through X-Men and discover The Sandman and then Dark Knight and Watchmen and beyond." The relatively new in-roads of comics and graphic novels into bookshops worked against Tundra at the time.

Eastman swiftly became aware that Tundra and the Turtles differed considerably, not least since the latter was successful enough to effectively run itself, with a few 'nudges' "to keep it moving along." Tundra, on the other hand, dealt in new properties, which required "building from the ground up," and was "a lot more work" than Eastman had anticipated, growing far too quickly for comfort, and requiring considerable injections of time and money, rather than being profitable.

Speaking in 1992/93, Eastman was optimistic that the company had "finally reached the point where [it had] slowed up enough... to be giving individual projects the time and attention they require[d];" Shortly thereafter, Tundra was bought out by Kitchen Sink Press, closing its (solo) doors after just three years, losing Eastman between $9 and $14 million.

Aftermath
Despite heavy financial losses, Eastman remained philosophical about his work with Tundra. In a 2007 interview, he drew the analogy that:

He made mention of the multiple award nominations Tundra received during its first and second years, including Harvey Awards and Eisner Awards, but noted that despite critical acclaim, the company was not making money on its titles, and had to cease production. He noted that Tundra was one of the earlier creator-owned companies, "before Image really took off" and before Dark Horse Comics' "Legends line."

Eastman admitted that Tundra tried to do too much too quickly, and ran into difficulties accordingly. He also suggested that "[n]ot one book made any money". He also believed that part of Tundra's downfall was tied to his offering Marvel and DC employees the chance to work on creator-owned and personal projects. He has stated in an interview that:

Heavy Metal

Kevin Eastman had been a longtime fan of the science fiction and fantasy magazine, much of whose content was translated from the French, and appeared in the original Métal Hurlant publication of which Heavy Metal is only the American-licensed incarnation. He cites the publication as bringing Richard Corben to his attention as the "second greatest influence" on him as an artist, after Jack Kirby. He saw in its pages European art which had not been previously seen in the United States, as well as an underground comix sensibility that nonetheless "wasn't as harsh or extreme as some of the underground comix – but... definitely intended for an older readership."

Discovering Heavy Metal had been put up for sale, and with one of Tundra's stated aims, to bring a more adult sensibility (and mature, adult readers) to comics, overlapping with the magazine's target audience, Eastman decided that Heavy Metal was "the final piece of the puzzle", and looked into purchasing it. Noting that:

 Eastman purchased the magazine in January 1992.

Despite the audiences for Heavy Metal and Tundra's intended product (as well as more mature-themed comics in general) being of a broadly similar demographic, Eastman recognized from the start that "most of the audience who read Heavy Metal buy it off the newsstands; they're not going into comic book stores," and stated early on that his intention was to produce "numerous crossovers from the cutting edge of comics creators" to expose the magazine's readership not just to the comics industry, "but anything from the visual media that can cross over."

Eastman also attempted to bring some European hardcover comics to America, using Heavy Metal to help serialize them and both defray the costs and boost readership. Initial interest, however, was "fairly cool."

Eastman sold the magazine to digital and music veteran David Boxenbaum and film producer Jeff Krelitz in January 2014. Eastman continued to serve as publisher of the magazine until 2020, and is a minority investor in the new Heavy Metal.

Other works
Aside from his work on multiple Teenage Mutant Ninja Turtles projects, and as publisher of Tundra Publishing, Eastman created Fistful of Blood, a black and white graphic novel featuring a blend of influences from Spaghetti Western and horror. The book featured art by Simon Bisley and was published by Heavy Metal.

Eastman has acted in a small number of films, including Guns of El Chupacabra in 1997 and The Rock n' Roll Cops in 2003. He also had a supporting role in the 2004 Troma film Tales from the Crapper. Before that, he had a cameo in the 2000 sequel to The Toxic Avenger called Citizen Toxie: The Toxic Avenger IV. and had a small role in the first TMNT movie as a garbage collector. He also wrote one episode of the animated children's series Corn & Peg.

He was the subject of an interview in the documentary films Independents, and Turtle Power: The Definitive History of the Teenage Mutant Ninja Turtles.

Kevin spends most of his creative time working on a new TMNT series with IDW Publishing, and editing Heavy Metal. He has partnered with writer, director and producer Robert Rodriguez to develop a new series of Heavy Metal inspired animated and live action films.

Art collection

Eastman purchased his first piece of original artwork ("a couple of pages that were penciled by Michael Golden and inked by Bob McLeod for Marvel Comics' Howard the Duck") at the Atlanta Fantasy Fair, the convention he and Laird attended in 1984. Collecting subsequently became "quite an addiction" for him, and combined with his experiences in getting his, and others', comics work recognised as "Art," led to him founding the Words & Pictures Museum, which operated as a brick-and-mortar museum from 1992 to 1999.

Personal life
Eastman has a son whom he had via surrogate named Shane. He was previously married to model and actress Julie Strain from 1995 to 2006.

Eastman married actress and producer Courtney Carr on October 5, 2013. They live in San Diego with his son Shane, and pet dachshunds.

References

External links
 Twitter account
 Official site
 Deviantart page
 
 Gary Groth interviews Kevin Eastman—PDF download (270kB) from the Heavy Metal site; this piece appeared originally in The Comics Journal No. 202
 Official Heavy Metal website
 Kevin Eastman interview from Newsarama

1962 births
20th-century American artists
20th-century American writers
21st-century American artists
21st-century American writers
American comics artists
American comics writers
American film producers
Artists from Portland, Maine
Inkpot Award winners
Living people
Mirage Studios
Publishers of adult comics
Role-playing game artists
Westbrook High School (Maine) alumni
Writers from Northampton, Massachusetts
Writers from Portland, Maine